The Sierrita Mountains (English: "Little Mountains") is a minor mountain range about forty miles southwest of Tucson, in Pima County, Arizona. Historically, the area has seen extensive mining and ranching activity: several ranches, abandoned mines, and the large Sierrita Mine are located in the area.

The Santa Cruz Valley bounds the range to the east separating it from the Santa Rita Mountains. The west margin of the range is the broad Altar Valley. To the southwest the Sierritas merge with the Cerro Colorado Mountains and the Penitas Hills. The Tumacacori Mountains of Santa Cruz County lie to the southeast.

Gallery

See also
 Copper mining in Arizona

References

External links
 
 

Mountain ranges of Pima County, Arizona
Mountain ranges of the Sonoran Desert
Mountain ranges of Arizona